Kaumakani (literally, "place in the wind" in the Hawaiian language) is a census-designated place (CDP) in Kauai County, Hawaii, United States. The population was 749 at the 2010 census, up from 607 at the 2000 census.

History
Kaumakani was officially known as "Makaweli" (which means "fearful features" in the Hawaiian language) for over forty years; Makaweli was an ancient land division (ahupuaa).
In 1914, the Board on Geographic Names ruled that the community was to be named Makaweli, and only in 1956 did it name the community Kaumakani. It has its own post office, with the ZIP code of 96747.

In 2008, a small settlement to the west at  known as Pakala Village was designated its own CDP, and has its own post office with code 96769. Makaweli Landing at Pākala was called "Robinson's Landing", since the family of Aubrey Robinson ran a private ferry to their island of Niihau. Pākala means "the sun shines" in Hawaiian.

Geography
Kaumakani is located on the southern shore of Kauai island at  (21.920292, -159.624281). The main road is Kaumualii Highway, Route 50.

Climate

Demographics

As of the census of 2000, there were 607 people, 207 households, and 162 families residing in the CDP. The racial makeup of the CDP was 4% White, 77% Asian, 2% Pacific Islander, <1% from other races, and 16% from two or more races. Hispanic or Latino of any race were 5% of the population.

There were 207 households, out of which 33% had children under the age of 18 living with them, 60% were married couples living together, 9% had a female householder with no husband present, and 21% were non-families. 18% of all households were made up of individuals, and 9% had someone living alone who was 65 years of age or older.  The average household size was 2.93 and the average family size was 3.34.

In the CDP the population was spread out, with 26% under the age of 18, 6% from 18 to 24, 28% from 25 to 44, 20% from 45 to 64, and 20% who were 65 years of age or older.  The median age was 40 years. For every 100 females, there were 104.4 males.  For every 100 females age 18 and over, there were 102.7 males.

The median income for a household in the CDP was $34,583, and the median income for a family was $41,250. Males had a median income of $26,429 versus $23,654 for females. The per capita income for the CDP was $14,024.  About 9% of families and 11% of the population were below the poverty line, including 11% of those under age 18 and 8% of those age 65 or over.

External links
Community of Kaumakani HI

References

Census-designated places in Kauai County, Hawaii
Populated places on Kauai
Populated coastal places in Hawaii